Jeoun Eun-ha ( or  ; born 28 January 1993) is a South Korean football player who plays for the WK League side Suwon FC. In 2013, she earned her first appearance for the South Korea women's national football team.

Jeoun scored four goals at the 2012 FIFA U-20 Women's World Cup. In 2012, she was awarded women's footballer of the year by the Korea Football Association.

References

External links
 

1993 births
Living people
South Korean women's footballers
South Korea women's under-17 international footballers
South Korea women's under-20 international footballers
South Korea women's international footballers
Women's association football forwards
Women's association football midfielders
Incheon Hyundai Steel Red Angels WFC players
WK League players